Jacopo Salviati (15 September 1461 – 6 September 1533) was a Florentine politician and son-in-law of Lorenzo de' Medici. On 10 September 1486 he married Lorenzo's daughter Lucrezia de' Medici, with whom he had ten children. The son of Giovanni Salviati and Maddalena Gondi, he devoted himself to the economic affairs of the family, becoming very wealthy. He then engaged in political life. He was Prior of the Guilds (see Guilds of Florence) in 1499 and 1518, then gonfaloniere of Justice in 1514. In 1513, he was appointed ambassador to Rome.

When his brother-in-law was elected as Pope Leo X, Jacopo benefited significantly. He was granted a salt monopoly in Romagna, and became a high officer in the Vatican treasury.  He earned an income from these of 15000 ducats each year.

He tried to prevent the Siege of Florence (1529–1530), but without result, and was among the advisers of Pope Clement VII during his meeting with Charles V, Holy Roman Emperor.

In 1531, he was part of the balìa of 200 Florentine citizens charged with reforming the republican government.

He died on 6 September 1553.


Issue 

His marriage to Lucrezia produced eleven children, six sons and five daughters:
Cardinal Giovanni Salviati (Florence, 1490 - Ravenna, 1553)
Lorenzo Salviati (Florence, 1492 - Ferrara, 1539), senator and patron
Piero Salviati, patrician
Elena Salviati (Florence, 1495 circa - Genoa, 1552), married the Marquis Pallavicino Pallavicino and second marriage to the Prince Iacopo V Appiani in Appiano
Caterina Salviati, married in 1511 Filippo Nerli, Florentine historical 
Battista Salviati (1498–1524)
Maria Salviati (1499–1543), married to Giovanni dalle Bande Nere. This marriage reunited the main and Popolano branches of the Medici family. His son, Cosimo, was named to lead Florence after the death of Duke Alessandro de' Medici
Luisa Salviati, married Sigismund de Luna and Peralta
Francesca Salviati, married first to Piero Gualterotti (they had a daughter, Maria, who married Filippo Salviati) and second, in 1533, to Ottaviano de' Medici and had by him a son, Pope Leo XI
Bernardo Salviati (1505/1508 - Rome, 1568), was a knight of the Order of St. John of Jerusalem, created a Cardinal in 1561
Alamanno (1510–1571), patrician

References

Sources

 Lauro Martines, April Blood: Florence and the Plot against the Medici [Paperback], 328 pages, Oxford Univ. Press,(2004), also accessible through Kindle, Publisher: Vintage Digital (January 31, 2011)., (ebook). Also, 
 Miles J. Unger, Magnifico: The Brilliant Life and Violent Times of Lorenzo de' Medici, edit. (May 5, 2009). Simon&Schuster Paperbacks, New York. American Journalist resident for 5 years in Florence, Italy, 
 Miles J. Unger, Machiaveli:A Biography", published June 14, 2011, accessible also through Kindle., 499 pages. 
 Christopher Hibbert, (1924 - 2008),  & Mary Hollingsworth: The Borgias and Their Enemies: 1431-1519'',  [Paperback], 321 pages, Harcourt Publ. Co, Orlando, Florida 

1461 births
1533 deaths
Jacopo
Ambassadors of the Republic of Florence
15th-century people of the Republic of Florence
16th-century people of the Republic of Florence